Geneviève Hennet de Goutel (1885–1917) was a French nurse who served during the First World War. From September to October 1916 she directed an auxiliary hospital, before joining a medical mission to Bucharest, where she trained Romanian nurses. She contracted typhus and died in March 1917. She received the Croix de guerre, Médaille d'honneur des épidémies (Medal of Honor of the epidemics) and the Croix de la Reine Marie (Romania) in recognition of her service. Her war diary and letters were compiled and published in 2017.

References

External link

1885 births
1917 deaths
French women nurses
French casualties of World War I
Deaths from typhus